"If You Ask Me To" is the debut single by American social media personality Charli D'Amelio. It was released in October 2022. It is a piano ballad about teenage heartbreak. She released a lyric and music video. The song was produced by Greg Keller, who also co-wrote the track with D'Amelio, Austin Sexton, Emi Secrest and Michael Schiavo. The music video was directed by Andrew Sandler.

Charts

References 

2022 debut singles
2022 songs
Piano ballades